Washington was admitted to the Union on November 11, 1889 and elects its United States senators to Class 1 and Class 3. Its current U.S. senators are Democrats Patty Murray (since 1993) and Maria Cantwell (since 2001). Warren Magnuson was Washington's longest-serving senator (1944–1981).

List of senators

|- style="height:2em"
| colspan=3 | Vacant
| nowrap | Nov 11, 1889 –Nov 20, 1889
| Washington elected its first senators after it was admitted to the Union.
| rowspan=3 | 1
| rowspan=2 
| rowspan=2 | 1
| Washington elected its first senators after it was admitted to the Union.
| nowrap | Nov 11, 1889 –Nov 20, 1889
| colspan=3 | Vacant

|- style="height:2em"
! rowspan=2 | 1
| rowspan=2 align=left | John B. Allen
| rowspan=2  | Republican
| rowspan=2 nowrap | Nov 20, 1889 –Mar 3, 1893
| rowspan=2 | Elected in 1889.Legislature failed to re-elect.
| Elected in 1889.
| rowspan=5 nowrap | Nov 20, 1889 –Mar 3, 1897
| rowspan=5  | Republican
| rowspan=5 align=right | Watson C. Squire
! rowspan=5 | 1

|- style="height:2em"
| 
| rowspan=4 | 2
| rowspan=4 | Re-elected in 1891.Lost re-election.

|- style="height:2em"
| colspan=3 | Vacant
| nowrap | Mar 4, 1893 –Feb 19, 1895
| Legislature failed to elect. The governor appointed John Allen, but the Senate rejected his credentials.
| rowspan=4 | 2
| rowspan=2 

|- style="height:2em"
! rowspan=3 | 2
| rowspan=3 align=left | John L. Wilson
| rowspan=3  | Republican
| rowspan=3 nowrap | Feb 19, 1895 –Mar 3, 1899
| rowspan=3 | Elected in 1895 to finish the vacant term, but took his seat late.Lost renomination.

|- style="height:2em"
| 

|- style="height:2em"
| 
| rowspan=3 | 3
| rowspan=3 | Elected in 1897.Lost re-election.
| rowspan=3 nowrap | Mar 4, 1897 –Mar 3, 1903
| rowspan=3  | Democratic
| rowspan=3 align=right | George Turner
! rowspan=3 | 2

|- style="height:2em"
! rowspan=3 | 3
| rowspan=3 align=left | Addison G. Foster
| rowspan=3  | Republican
| rowspan=3 nowrap | Mar 4, 1899 –Mar 3, 1905
| rowspan=3 | Elected in 1899.Retired.
| rowspan=3 | 3
| 

|- style="height:2em"
| 

|- style="height:2em"
| 
| rowspan=3 | 4
| rowspan=3 | Elected in 1903.Lost renomination.
| rowspan=3 nowrap | Mar 4, 1903 –Mar 3, 1909
| rowspan=3  | Republican
| rowspan=3 align=right | Levi Ankeny
! rowspan=3 | 3

|- style="height:2em"
! rowspan=3 | 4
| rowspan=3 align=left | Samuel H. Piles
| rowspan=3  | Republican
| rowspan=3 nowrap | Mar 4, 1905 –Mar 3, 1911
| rowspan=3 | Elected in 1905.Retired.
| rowspan=3 | 4
| 

|- style="height:2em"
| 

|- style="height:2em"
| 
| rowspan=3 | 5
| rowspan=3 | Elected in 1909.
| rowspan=12 nowrap | Mar 4, 1909 –Nov 19, 1932
| rowspan=12  | Republican
| rowspan=12 align=right | Wesley Livsey Jones
! rowspan=12 | 4

|- style="height:2em"
! rowspan=6 | 5
| rowspan=6 align=left | Miles Poindexter
|  | Republican
| rowspan=6 nowrap | Mar 4, 1911 –Mar 3, 1923
| rowspan=3 | Elected in 1911.
| rowspan=3 | 5
| 

|- style="height:2em"
|  | Progressive
| 

|- style="height:2em"
| rowspan=4  | Republican
| 
| rowspan=3 | 6
| rowspan=3 | Re-elected in 1914.

|- style="height:2em"
| rowspan=3 | Re-elected in 1916.Lost re-election.
| rowspan=3 | 6
| 

|- style="height:2em"
| 

|- style="height:2em"
| 
| rowspan=3 | 7
| rowspan=3 | Re-elected in 1920.

|- style="height:2em"
! rowspan=8 | 6
| rowspan=8 align=left | Clarence Dill
| rowspan=8  | Democratic
| rowspan=8 nowrap | Mar 4, 1923 –Jan 3, 1935
| rowspan=3 | Elected in 1922.
| rowspan=3 | 7
| 

|- style="height:2em"
| 

|- style="height:2em"
| 
| rowspan=5 | 8
| rowspan=3 | Re-elected in 1926.Died, having already lost re-election.

|- style="height:2em"
| rowspan=5 | Re-elected in 1928.Retired.
| rowspan=5 | 8
| 

|- style="height:2em"
| rowspan=3 

|- style="height:2em"
|  
| nowrap | Nov 19, 1932 –Nov 22, 1932
| colspan=3 | Vacant

|- style="height:2em"
| Appointed to finish Jones's term.Retired.
| nowrap | Nov 22, 1932 –Mar 3, 1933
|  | Republican
| align=right | Elijah S. Grammer
! 5

|- style="height:2em"
| 
| rowspan=3 | 9
| rowspan=3 | Elected in 1932.
| rowspan=8 nowrap | Mar 4, 1933 –Nov 13, 1944
| rowspan=8  | Democratic
| rowspan=8 align=right | Homer Bone
! rowspan=8 | 6

|- style="height:2em"
! rowspan=3 | 7
| rowspan=3 align=left | Lewis B. Schwellenbach
| rowspan=3  | Democratic
| rowspan=3 nowrap | Jan 3, 1935 –Dec 16, 1940
| rowspan=3 | Elected in 1934.Resigned.
| rowspan=5 | 9
| 

|- style="height:2em"
| 

|- style="height:2em"
| rowspan=3 
| rowspan=7 | 10
| rowspan=5 | Re-elected in 1938.Resigned to become Judge on the United States Court of Appeals for the Ninth Circuit.

|- style="height:2em"
| colspan=3 | Vacant
| nowrap | Dec 16, 1940 –Dec 19, 1940
|  

|- style="height:2em"
! rowspan=6 | 8
| rowspan=6 align=left | Monrad Wallgren
| rowspan=6  | Democratic
| rowspan=6 nowrap | Dec 19, 1940 –Jan 9, 1945
| Appointed to finish Schwellenbach's term, having already been elected to the next term.

|- style="height:2em"
| rowspan=5 | Elected in 1940.Resigned.
| rowspan=7 | 10
| 

|- style="height:2em"
| rowspan=3 

|- style="height:2em"
|  
| nowrap | Nov 13, 1944 –Dec 14, 1944
| colspan=3 | Vacant

|- style="height:2em"
| Appointed to finish Bone's term, having already been elected to the next term.
| rowspan=21 nowrap | Dec 14, 1944 –Jan 3, 1981
| rowspan=21  | Democratic
| rowspan=21 align=right | Warren Magnuson
! rowspan=21 | 7

|- style="height:2em"
| rowspan=3 
| rowspan=5 | 11
| rowspan=5 | Elected in 1944.

|- style="height:2em"
! 9
| align=left | Hugh Mitchell
|  | Democratic
| nowrap | Jan 10, 1945 –Dec 25, 1946
| Appointed to finish Wallgren's term.Lost election to next term and resigned.

|- style="height:2em"
! rowspan=4 | 10
| rowspan=4 align=left | Harry P. Cain
| rowspan=4  | Republican
| rowspan=4 nowrap | Dec 26, 1946 –Jan 3, 1953
| Appointed to finish Mitchell's term, having already been elected to the next term.

|- style="height:2em"
| rowspan=3 | Elected in 1946.Lost re-election.
| rowspan=3 | 11
| 

|- style="height:2em"
| 

|- style="height:2em"
| 
| rowspan=3 | 12
| rowspan=3 | Re-elected in 1950.

|- style="height:2em"
! rowspan=16 | 11
| rowspan=16 align=left | Henry M. Jackson
| rowspan=16  | Democratic
| rowspan=16 nowrap | Jan 3, 1953 –Sep 1, 1983
| rowspan=3 | Elected in 1952.
| rowspan=3 | 12
| 

|- style="height:2em"
| 

|- style="height:2em"
| 
| rowspan=3 | 13
| rowspan=3 | Re-elected in 1956.

|- style="height:2em"
| rowspan=3 | Re-elected in 1958.
| rowspan=3 | 13
| 

|- style="height:2em"
| 

|- style="height:2em"
| 
| rowspan=3 | 14
| rowspan=3 | Re-elected in 1962.

|- style="height:2em"
| rowspan=3 | Re-elected in 1964.
| rowspan=3 | 14
| 

|- style="height:2em"
| 

|- style="height:2em"
| 
| rowspan=3 | 15
| rowspan=3 | Re-elected in 1968.

|- style="height:2em"
| rowspan=3 | Re-elected in 1970.
| rowspan=3 | 15
| 

|- style="height:2em"
| 

|- style="height:2em"
| 
| rowspan=3 | 16
| rowspan=3 | Re-elected in 1974.Lost re-election.

|- style="height:2em"
| rowspan=3 | Re-elected in 1976.
| rowspan=3 | 16
| 

|- style="height:2em"
| 

|- style="height:2em"
| 
| rowspan=5 | 17
| rowspan=5 | Elected in 1980.Lost re-election.
| rowspan=5 nowrap | Jan 3, 1981 –Jan 3, 1987
| rowspan=5  | Republican
| rowspan=5 align=right | Slade Gorton
! rowspan=5 | 8

|- style="height:2em"
| Re-elected in 1982.Died.
| rowspan=5 | 17
| rowspan=3 

|- style="height:2em"
| colspan=3 | Vacant
| nowrap | Sep 1, 1983 –Sep 8, 1983
|  

|- style="height:2em"
! rowspan=3 | 12
| rowspan=3 align=left | Daniel J. Evans
| rowspan=3  | Republican
| rowspan=3 nowrap | Sep 8, 1983 –Jan 3, 1989
| rowspan=3 | Appointed to continue Jackson's term.Elected to finish Jackson's term.Retired.

|- style="height:2em"
| 

|- style="height:2em"
| 
| rowspan=3 | 18
| rowspan=3 | Elected in 1986.Retired.
| rowspan=3 nowrap | Jan 3, 1987 –Jan 3, 1993
| rowspan=3  | Democratic
| rowspan=3 align=right | Brock Adams
! rowspan=3 | 9

|- style="height:2em"
! rowspan=6 | 13
| rowspan=6 align=left | Slade Gorton
| rowspan=6  | Republican
| rowspan=6 nowrap | Jan 3, 1989 –Jan 3, 2001
| rowspan=3 | Elected in 1988.
| rowspan=3 | 18
| 

|- style="height:2em"
| 

|- style="height:2em"
| 
| rowspan=3 | 19
| rowspan=3 | Elected in 1992.
| rowspan=18 nowrap | Jan 3, 1993 –Present
| rowspan=18  | Democratic
| rowspan=18 align=right | Patty Murray
! rowspan=18 | 10

|- style="height:2em"
| rowspan=3 | Re-elected in 1994.Lost re-election.
| rowspan=3 | 19
| 

|- style="height:2em"
| 

|- style="height:2em"
| 
| rowspan=3 | 20
| rowspan=3 | Re-elected in 1998.

|- style="height:2em"
! rowspan=12 | 14
| rowspan=12 align=left | Maria Cantwell
| rowspan=12  | Democratic
| rowspan=12 nowrap | Jan 3, 2001 –Present
| rowspan=3 | Elected in 2000.
| rowspan=3 | 20
| 

|- style="height:2em"
| 

|- style="height:2em"
| 
| rowspan=3 | 21
| rowspan=3 | Re-elected in 2004.

|- style="height:2em"
| rowspan=3 | Re-elected in 2006.
| rowspan=3 | 21
| 

|- style="height:2em"
| 

|- style="height:2em"
| 
| rowspan=3 | 22
| rowspan=3 | Re-elected in 2010.

|- style="height:2em"
| rowspan=3 | Re-elected in 2012.
| rowspan=3 | 22
| 

|- style="height:2em"
| 

|- style="height:2em"
| 
| rowspan=3 | 23
| rowspan=3 | Re-elected in 2016.

|- style="height:2em"
| rowspan=3 | Re-elected in 2018.
| rowspan=3 | 23
| 

|- style="height:2em"
| 

|- style="height:2em"
| 
| rowspan=3 | 24
| rowspan=3 | Re-elected in 2022.

|- style="height:2em"
| rowspan=3 colspan=5 | To be determined in the 2024 election.
| rowspan=3| 24
| 

|- style="height:2em"
| 

|- style="height:2em"
| 
| 25
| colspan=5 | To be determined in the 2028 election.

See also

 List of United States representatives from Washington
 United States congressional delegations from Washington
 Elections in Washington (state)

References

 
United States senators
Washington